Branagh is a surname. Notable people with the surname include:

Kenneth Branagh (born 1960), Northern Irish actor and filmmaker
Nicole Branagh (born 1979), American volleyball player

See also
Bronagh